Józefa Rostkowska (1784–1896), was a Polish heroine of the November uprising against Russia. She served as a nurse both in the uprising of 1830 as well as during the Crimean War.

References
 Henri Musielak, Polonica w Archiwum Północnej Francji w Lille. Archeion, t. LXII, 1975

1784 births
1896 deaths
People of the November Uprising
Polish nurses
19th-century Polish people
19th-century Polish women
Nurses from the Russian Empire